The Seville Expo '92 was a universal exposition that took place from Monday, April 20 to Monday, October 12, 1992, on La Isla de La Cartuja (Charterhouse Island), Seville, Spain. The theme for the expo was "The Age of Discovery", celebrating the 500th anniversary of Christopher Columbus reaching the Americas after launching from Seville's port (on the Guadalquivir), and over 100 countries were represented. The exposition ran at the same time as the smaller and shorter-duration Genoa Expo '92, a Specialized Exhibition, held in memory of Christopher Columbus, born in Genoa.

Joint exposition proposal with Chicago

Expo'92 was organized to celebrate the 500th anniversary of the discovery of the Americas by Christopher Columbus (1492-1992). The exposition was to be jointly held with the City of Chicago, however, due to national, state, and local funding difficulties, Chicago did not accept the offer.

Site
Expo'92 Seville was widely known for its massive site, held at the Isla de la Cartuja, reputed site of reference for Columbus for his voyage to the New World, and required at least several days to visit most of the pavilions. It was also known for its numerous spectacular gates and bridges, and the diversity of transport within the expo site from bus to ferry boat, to cable car and monorail. It also gave an impressive architectural tour of the world, with many countries vying for the position of the most inventive or creative pavilion structure - outstanding amongst these was the Pavilion of Japan - the world's largest wooden structure, the Pavilion of Morocco, a re-creation of a Moroccan Palace-Mansion, and the modernistic cube and sphere of the flagship Spanish Pavilion, to name a few. The most popular pavilions with visitors were those of Spain and Canada.

The event was directed by Manuel Olivencia. "Long-term benefits [to Seville] will include new airports in Seville and Jerez, airport renovation in Málaga, a new port and train station here, new railroad lines, trains and highways, not to mention a completely new infrastructure," Olivencia said. He also saw time as an issue with planning of the event, as well as staff changes. Olivencia prevented the United States from having the largest pavilion: "we as hosts intend to have the largest".

Pavilions 

Pavilions at the expo consisted of the Royal Pavilion and the five thematic pavilions - Navigation, Discovery, Nature, Environment, and the Fifteenth Century; the flagship Spanish and Andalusian pavilions at the Lake of Spain; the Spanish Autonomous Regions pavilions all along the Lake of Spain; over 100 international pavilions; and numerous corporate pavilions.

In particular, the Discoveries Pavilion featured an Omnimax Theatre, where a Spanish government commissioned theme film, Eureka!, made by Greg MacGillivray and Jon Boorstin, based on The Discoverers, by Daniel J. Boorstin was presented. The first IMAX film to use a light-weight hand held camera (with a steadicam), it won the principal creative award at the fair.

To offset costs by developing nations, and to allow a 'first-ever' representation by every South American nation, a special monumental structure, the 'Plaza de Américas' was constructed, a large enclosed Plaza-type building in a rustic red colour which also hosted a special Exhibition on the Gold of South America. A 'Plaza de África' was also created to allow maximum participation from developing African states.

The HD-MAC standard, an early analog high-definition television system, was demonstrated at the expo.

Mascot
Curro was the mascot for the fair. It has the shape of a big white bird with the legs of an elephant, whose long conical beak and crest had the colours of the rainbow.

It was created by German designer Heinz Edelmann (who is best known for his work on the 1968 animated film, Yellow Submarine), who also gave it the name Curro, an Andalusian pet form of Spanish male name Francisco.

It was presented officially in the Plaza de España of Seville, in a big fest of light and sound on the 20 April 1990, two years before the Fair's inauguration.

Climate control
The hot Sevillian summer was largely abated by a microfilter water air conditioning system throughout the site, principally along the main avenues and streets, under canopied sections both of tensile fabric and greenery. Visitors were sprayed with cool mist in various locations, and could make use of the numerous fountains and wading pools to cool off.

Post-expo, the expo site today
At the conclusion of the expo, many of the pavilions were dismantled, and today the site is divided between a research and development park called Cartuja 93 and a theme park called Isla Mágica, the 'Magic Island', which also hosts the popular Pavilion of Spain. The Government of Canada donated the Canadian Pavilion for use as a new trade school.

One can walk throughout Cartuja 93 for free, however, admission to the Isla Mágica requires an entrance fee.

Countries represented

Over one hundred nations were represented at the expo, making it one of the largest ever hosted up to that time.
 Spain - the flagship Spanish Pavilion was noted for its strikingly simplistic and modernistic cube and sphere, located dramatically on the edge of the artificial Lake of Spain and along the 'Road of the Discoveries' and the end of the Avenue of Europe. The cube of the pavilion hosted a unique gathering of the best of Spanish art, including works by Miró, Dalí, Carvaggio and others, and the dome of the pavilion hosted an Iwerks 15/70 Dome moving seat theatre presentation, which took one on a simulated tour of some of the best sights of Spain. The pavilion restaurant was also highly rated.
 The European Union, and Nations of the European Union - were all located along the Avenue of Europe, which featured twelve massive white-coloured towers, and a central multi-coloured tower featuring the flags of the (then) twelve nations of the European Union - which underground hosted the European Union Pavilion itself. The rest of the pavilions of the Union were located at the left and right flank of the Avenue.
 Germany - on behalf of the German Federal President Richard von Weizsäcker the show theater "Traumfabrik" created and organized the "German Day" and represented Germany culturally. 
 China - was represented with a large Chinese Gate at its entrance, and a large magnificent tapestry of the Great Wall of China on the inside entrance. To one side the sights of China were represented in a 360 degree cinema presentation.
 Russia - the first representation by Russia after the Dissolution of the Soviet Union featured an angled pavilion with many coloured moving squares on its roof, which changed to represent different messages, i.e. the Russian Flag, the words 'Russia' and so on. Inside one could see aspects of the Russian space program and a Russian satellite suspended from the pavilion ceiling.
 United States - the U.S. pavilion was funded by Amway, General Motors and many other corporate sponsors, as part of a Public-private partnership. It featured on the outside a Space Age depiction of the American flag, in three large suspended structures, which could be seen from many angles from afar, and a large modern mural by the German-American artist Peter Max, depicting the history of discovery from the voyage of Christopher Columbus and his encounter with the American continent, to the Space Shuttle. The pavilion itself consisted of several structures: a large cinema presentation "World Song" produced by award-winning experience designer Bob Rogers (designer) and the design team BRC Imagination Arts, for General Motors which explored the common stages of life among all nations and people.  During the run of the expo, the film also played to an international audience at AmeriFlora '92, an international horticultural exhibition held in Columbus, Ohio.  Other exhibits at the U.S. pavilion included the Bill of Rights exhibition, and the Freedom House, a working modern American home that could be visited.
 Puerto Rico (a U.S. territory) - participated in Expo '92 with a separate pavilion from that of the United States. The US$31 million pavilion (equivalent to $ million in ), which was much larger and more ornate than the U.S. pavilion, was seen as one of several large projects undertaken by pro-Commonwealth governor Rafael Hernández Colón to underscore Puerto Rico's cultural and historical links to Latin America, Spain, and Europe. The Wall Street Journal Europe described the Puerto Rican National Pavilion as: "a stunning mix of three geometric 'volumes': a triangle of stone with large perforations based on sentry posts in military fortifications on the island, a modernistic white porcelain pergola, and a sleek copper-clad cylinder. Around the pavilion are transplanted palms that grown only on Puerto Rico, Roystonea borinquena. Caribbean coral will decorate the bottom of the reflecting pool around the buildings." After the expo, Puerto Rico sold the pavilion for US$4 million ($ million in ) to Correos, the Spanish postal service, for use as a training facility.
 Japan - featured the world's largest wooden structure, with a large escalator that took visitors up into the heart of the structure, from where they could descend into the lower levels of the inside the multi-level pavilion. Outside the pavilion, one could see a snapshot of Japanese society in the queue, featuring life-size photo portraits of Japanese persons in their respective professions. Also featured a three-segmented moving anime movie on Japan at the time of Columbus as seen by Don Quixote, and a scale representation of the top floors of a Japanese castle.
 India. The architecture of the Indian pavilion represented an Indian peacock, with a blue mast for the neck and head, and angled tiles representing the many-coloured tail plume.
 Morocco - considered one of the most beautiful pavilions at the expo, this pavilion was styled as a three-storied traditional Moroccan Palace-Mansion, with jewel-like fountain in the centre, and open to the sky atrium and restaurant. This pavilion is one of the few permanent Pavilions and can still be viewed at the expo site today.
 Italy - the Italian Pavilion was one of the largest pavilions and featured a broad exposition on Italian Art, Invention and Discovery. Today it also remains at the expo site as an administrative centre for numerous corporations and businesses.
 New Zealand - The New Zealand pavilion featured the exhibition Treasures of the Underworld, performances by Māori kapa haka groups, and a performance by the opera singer Kiri Te Kanawa on New Zealand Day.
 Australia - featured a curved walkway entrance with a several-story rainforest atrium, with tropical palm trees, birds and butterflies from the State of Queensland; a large Aquarium tank representing the ecosystem of the Great Barrier Reef, resplendent with live tropical fish and coral; an Australian Gold Exhibition, featuring precious Australian works of jewellery, most notably including the Argyle Library Egg; and the Australian Cinema presentation, the Australian Hexaplex, a moving five-screen 360-degree slide and video presentation, set to music, featuring footage from the width and breadth of the Australian nation. A Gift Shop also featured, presented by the Australian Broadcasting Corporation's Gift Shop stores arm.
 Turkey - The highlight of the Turkish pavilion was an interactive promotional software which was presenting Turkish tourism sector, cultural values and economical opportunities. The visitors interacted with this multimedia software via large touchscreen monitors and the application was awarded "the best use of multimedia" award of the expo.
 Canada - The highlight of the Canadian pavilion was the National Film Board of Canada film Momentum, the world's only motion picture presented in 48 frames per second IMAX HD. The pavilion also had an artificial pond surrounding a stage with performances that entertained visitors queuing for the pavilion. In addition to a gift shop and exhibit area, the pavilion also housed the Aurora Borealis restaurant that served Arctic fare from northern Canada.
 Jamaica - The pavilion was sponsored by Jamaican Government and the private sector. The concept for the pavilion was a country bus tour taking you through the Jamaican countryside to a village square surrounded by shop frontages which contained the products of the sponsors. The theme was designed by architect Michael Lake and the artwork and construction was done by Will Robson, Margaret Robson and Umbala at the Magic Toys Workshop in Walderston, Jamaica. [Jamaica Gleaner archives]
 Israel - The Israeli pavilion represented of the exodus of the Jewish people for two thousand years and its coming together as a result of the creation of the State of Israel.

References

External links

Official website of the BIE
 Exposicion universal de Sevilla
 European Patent Office
 Web oficial de la asociación Legado Expo Sevilla
 http://www.expo92.es Expo '92 (in Spanish)
 Expo '92 Blog - information and images (in Spanish)
 Expo 1992 review, maps and photos of all pavilions by WorldExpositions.info
 information and images (in Spanish)
 Foundation Expo '88's take on Expo '92 Seville 'My Seville My Expo '92 My 1992'. Includes what it was like to work as a Guide for the Expo and a photograph diary transcript.
 IBM Guest Services System (includes a video with high production quality, this guest information system won the highest design award from the Human Factors and Ergonomics Society)
 Traumfabrik.de

 
1992 in Spain
History of Seville